Matchstick models are scale models made from matches as a hobby. Regular matches are not used, however, but a special modeling type which do not have the combustible heads, and can be bought from art and craft shops. Though before the serial production of these, actual matches were used with heads trimmed off, or kept on to add coloured detail.

History
Originally, matchstick models were a pastime of prisoners (especially naval prisoners of war) during the 18th century. At the time, better funded modelers preferred to use more replicated parts for their models, like professionals today, and the poor couldn't afford to use up so many matches.

Construction
The matches are cut by means of a sharp knife and fixed together using glue, often being held in place by paperboard "formers" until the glue is dry. While the smallest gaps can be filled with glue, larger ones can be filled with specially carved matches. A number of hobbyists prefer to build their models from scratch. Many kits are available, consisting of instructions, pre-cut card formers and sufficient modeling matches for the project. 

An exceptionally large and impressive matchstick model was a scratch-built replica of Notre Dame Cathedral which included electric lights and measured over six feet in length.

External links
 

Scale modeling